Damon Jerrel Dunn  (born March 15, 1976) is an American politician, commercial real estate developer, minister, and former football player.

Early life 
Dunn was born in 1976 in Fort Worth, Texas to a 16-year-old mother, Ramona Dunn. When Dunn was three years old his father, Texas Longhorns starting wide receiver, Mike Lockett, was killed in a car accident. Dunn grew up in a trailer on his grandparents' farm. Dunn was an honor student in Sam Houston High School in Arlington, Texas and an All-State Texas football player.

College 
After high school Dunn attended Stanford University on a football scholarship after being recruited by Bill Walsh. Dunn also ran track at Stanford. At Stanford Dunn was coached by Tyrone Willingham and Dunn has said he viewed him as a father figure, having grown up without a male role model in his life. While at Stanford Dunn set numerous records and was awarded an NCAA Academic Scholarship, All-Pac-10 Honors and Academic All-Pac-10 Honors, and the National Football Foundation and College Hall of Fame Award. During his career at Stanford Dunn participated as an associate pastor in the Jerusalem Baptist Church, where he managed youth ministries.

NFL career
Dunn graduated from Stanford in 1998 with a degree in public policy. He was not picked in the 1998 NFL Draft. The season after he graduated from Stanford, Dunn was on the practice squad of the National Football League team Jacksonville Jaguars. Dunn then played for the Cleveland Browns in 1999. The next year, Dunn played in the Berlin Thunder of NFL Europe, the New York Jets of the NFL, and the Browns in 2000. In 2001, Dunn played for the XFL team Los Angeles Xtreme; the XFL folded after that season. Dunn joined Dallas Cowboys training camp before the 2001 NFL season. He left the NFL after being injured there.

Other ventures
After retiring from the NFL, Dunn and a former Stanford roommate became partners in an Irvine, California-based real estate business, which developed several shopping centers.

Politics

California Secretary of State
In 2009, Dunn announced that he would run for California Secretary of State challenging incumbent Democrat Debra Bowen. The Los Angeles Sentinel quoted Dunn: "There are a lot of African Americans that are conservative fiscally, but we don't have the welcoming face in the Republican Party."

In March 2010, Orly Taitz qualified to run for the office of California Secretary of State. At the same time, she unsuccessfully challenged the eligibility of her Republican Party primary opponent, Dunn, claiming that he was pretending to be a Republican. While playing for the Jacksonville Jaguars, Dunn had registered to vote as a Democrat in 1999 but that registration expired in 2005.

On May 12, 2010, Pamela Barnett (named plaintiff from Taitz's lawsuit Barnett v. Obama) filed a lawsuit in the Sacramento County Superior Court alleging that Dunn was not eligible to run for Secretary of State.

The San Francisco Chronicle endorsed Dunn for the June 2010 primary. Ronnie Lott, a Hall of Fame NFL player, endorsed Dunn the following month.

Taitz was defeated by Dunn in the June 8 primary by a margin of about three to one, losing by over 900,000 votes.

On June 17, 2010, Taitz filed a lawsuit in the Orange County Superior Court contesting the election results, again alleging Dunn's ineligibility. On March 17, 2011, the judge ruled against Taitz. On May 1, 2012, a California Court of Appeal affirmed the superior court's ruling.

Mayor of Long Beach
In 2014 Dunn ran for Mayor of Long Beach. He qualified for the runoff by finishing second in the primary election, and faced Robert Garcia on June 3.

Dunn lost the election to Robert Garcia, former vice-mayor on June 3, 2014.

Electoral history

Personal life 
While in the NFL, Dunn worked with the Make-a-Wish Foundation visiting kids with terminal diseases. Dunn started the Fighting Giants Ministry that ministers to children with life changing injuries. Dunn has also worked with St. Augustine Soup Kitchen, the Cops-N-Kids program and the Cleveland Clinic Foundation. Dunn served as president of his local Fellowship of Christian Athletes  chapter and has spoken nationally at FCA events. Dunn is also a licensed Baptist minister and a member of Antioch Church of Long Beach. He lives in Long Beach, California.

References

External links
 

1976 births
Living people
African-American players of American football
American football wide receivers
American athlete-politicians
Berlin Thunder players
California Republicans
Cleveland Browns players
Dallas Cowboys players
Jacksonville Jaguars players
Los Angeles Xtreme players
New York Jets players
Players of American football from Fort Worth, Texas
Southern Baptist ministers
Stanford Cardinal football players
21st-century African-American sportspeople
20th-century African-American sportspeople